Nandha is a 2001 Indian Tamil-language action drama film written and directed by Bala. The film stars Suriya in the lead role, while Rajkiran, Laila, Saravanan and Rajshree play other supporting roles. The film also marked the debut of comedian Karunas. The score was by Yuvan Shankar Raja and cinematography by R. Rathnavelu.

Nandha is story about a young man from a borstal coming back to a society and his family he had left many years ago. It is about a battle of love and life, and how a misfit tries to fight to fit into the usual social circus, a fight to earn his mother's love, and a fight to live the second chance he has given himself.

Plot
The plot opens with a mother and her children arriving at Rameshwaram. The elder child, Nandha is sent to a rehabilitation center for murdering his father as a boy after witnessing his father's illicit affair with a prostitute and abuse towards Nandha's mother when she finds it. He returns home to his mother, who is deaf and mute, and his younger sister who are still in a state of shock after what has happened to their family.

Nandha decides to start life afresh by trying to study in a college. Having the record of being an ex-convict, he finds it difficult to get a seat in the college. He then meets Periyavar, a very rich disciplinarian who runs an arts and science college with an iron hand. Periyavar's forefathers were the kings of the Ramanathapuram kingdom and fell in line in with the Britishers. After independence, all of their palaces and titles were taken by India's government, but a lot of other material wealth was in their hands. He still thinks himself a guardian of people and helps a lot of poor people. He even goes to the extent of providing justice when law and police cannot or will not.

Periyavar develops a soft corner for Nandha and guides him like his own son. Kalyani, a Sri Lankan Tamil refugee from Jaffna, meets Nandha and both fall in love. Meanwhile, the villain Durai asks Periyavar, who currently helps the students in his college a lot to aid an antisocial element, but Periyavar refuses outright.

Periyavar's one of the betraying sidekicks agrees to help Durai. Meanwhile, Periyavar falls sick and gets admitted in the hospital. Nandha stays around to look after his mentor and guide. Fearing what he has done might be out in the light, Durai pulls out the oxygen tube of Periyavar in the hospital when Nandha is not around and blames Nandha for murdering his father-in-law. Nandha, having to deal with the pain of losing the only man who gave him a second chance to live, struggles the fray of being convicted of murder once again and chooses to kill Durai in the court campus. However, the case is dismissed due to the lack of evidence. Finally, Nandha is acquitted as there are no eyewitnesses to the murder.

After being acquitted for Durai's murder, Nandha returns home. However, his paranoid mother, still thinks that her son still has murder instincts, so she waits at home to feed a meal, which she has poisoned herself for him. Nandha finds out that the food is poisoned when he eats it, but continues to do so with a satisfaction that he is being fed by his mother. Nandha dies in his mother's lap and when his friend Lodukku Pandi, his sister and Kalyani come out to see what has happened, they realise that both mother and son are dead and the former three mourn the deaths of Nandha and his mother. The movie ends there.

Cast
 Suriya as Nandha
 Laila as Kalyani
 Rajkiran as Periyavar
 Karunas as 'Lodukku' Pandi
 Saravanan as Periyavar's son-in-law, Durai
 Rajashree as Nandha's mother
 Sheela as Nandha's sister
 Vinod Kishan as Nandha (child)
 Mu Ramaswamy

Production
The title role was initially offered to Ajith Kumar, who rejected the film citing that Bala had not fully developed the story and screenplay before narrating the terms to him. Ajith's departure meant that the film's proposed producer, Poornachandra Rao, also backed out. Suriya was selected as his replacement instead. The director also tried to rope in Sivaji Ganesan for a character role in the film, but his unavailability led to Rajkiran being cast. Despite initial reports that Simran would work on the film, Laila was signed on as heroine to play a Sri Lankan Tamil refugee, Kalyani.

The role required Suriya to undergo physical change, so production was delayed until Suriya had finished filming for Friends and Uyirile Kalanthathu. The first look of the film created media anticipation, with both Suriya and Rajkiran sporting looks which they had not portrayed before. Post-release, Suriya has stated "when Nandha happened, everything changed. I became a serious actor, and director Bala instilled in me the discipline to work without committing errors."

Release
The satellite rights of the film were sold to Sun TV. The critic from The Hindu noted that "powerful performance by the lead artists, a neat screenplay and narration without any deviations in the form of dance or song make Nandhaa worth watching. Bala's direction makes viewing a gripping experience." The critic added that "Surya as the young rustic man has reached a new milestone in acting. Rajkiran shines in the role of Periyavar. A surprise, however, is Rajashri, who reveals great histrionic skills." In comparison, Rediff.com stated the film failed to live up to expectations, likening it to Kamal Haasan's Aalavandhan and stated that "the screenplay is smooth and incident-driven. In the final analysis, it is the climax that may be the main reason why the audience does not lap up this film."

Prior to its release film faced many troubles. The film was telecast in TV channels during first week of the film release but the film got a big hit response in theatre. In 2004, the film was to be remade in Telugu starring Nandamuri Kalyan Ram and Anu Mehta, but the film was later dropped. The film has been dubbed and released in the Telugu language three times, firstly as Aakrosham (2006) and then as Pratheekaram in 2009. A third dubbed version titled Bala-Surya was released by Nagamalla Shankar in 2011, shortly after the release of Bala's Avan Ivan.

Awards and nominations

Soundtrack

The soundtrack was composed by Yuvan Shankar Raja, son of noted composer Ilaiyaraaja, who usually scores the music for a Bala film. The soundtrack was released on 21 October 2001 at Hotel Connemara, Chennai by actor Kamal Haasan and director Bharathiraja. It features 6 tracks, out of which two were sung by Ilaiyaraaja. The songs "Amma Endrale" and "Orayiram" are based on the raaga Pantuvarali. The lyrics of five songs were written by five different lyricists, while "Maayane Andha"'s lyrics were derived from the Thiruppavai written and sung by Aandaal.

*The chorus consists of singers Ganga, Kanchana, Febi, Feji and Charulatha Mani

Legacy 
Karunas reprised his role as "Lodukku Pandi" in the film of the same name in 2015.

References

External links

2001 films
2001 action drama films
Indian action drama films
Films directed by Bala (director)
Films scored by Yuvan Shankar Raja
2000s Tamil-language films